Racket is the nineteenth and final studio album by power electronics band Whitehouse, released on 31 May 2007 through the Susan Lawly label. The album was originally supposed to come out on March 13 of that year, but due to issues with recording, the album's release date was set back by a couple of weeks. Instruments used in the album were synthesizers, the djembe, doundouns, and ksings.

The album artwork was done by Stefan Danielsson, a Swedish artist who specializes in collages with African and Haitian influences.

Track listing

Personnel
William Bennett - vocals, instruments, production, "animal response technician"
Philip Best - vocals, instruments, "dirty word specialist"
Stefan Daneilsson - artwork
Denis Blackham - mastering

References

2007 albums
Whitehouse (band) albums